This is a list of Slovak football transfers in the winter transfer window 2011–12 by club. Only transfers of the First League are included.

Slovak First League

1. FC Tatran Prešov

In:
 

Out:

AS Trenčín

In:
 

 
Out:

FC Nitra

In:

Out:

FC Spartak Trnava

In:
 

Out:

FC ViOn Zlaté Moravce

In:
 

Out:

FK DAC 1904 Dunajská Streda

In:

Out:

FK Dukla Banská Bystrica

In:

Out:

FK Senica

In:

Out:

MFK Košice

In:

Out:

MFK Ružomberok

In:

Out:

MŠK Žilina

In:

Out:

ŠK Slovan Bratislava

In:

Out:

See also
2011-12 Slovak First League

References

External links
 Slovak Football First League- official site
 Slovak Soccer portal - official site

Slovak
2011–12
Transfers